Shadow of Doubt is a 1998 American independent crime-mystery thriller and courtroom drama film directed by Randal Kleiser and starring Melanie Griffith, Tom Berenger, Craig Sheffer, and Huey Lewis.

Cast 

 Melanie Griffith as Kit Devereaux
 Tom Berenger as Jack Campioni
 Craig Sheffer as Laird Atkins
 Huey Lewis as Al Gordon
 Wade Dominguez as Bobby Medina
 James Morrison as Paul Saxon
 Nina Foch as Sylvia Saxon
 Tony Plana as Det. Krause
 Richard Portnow as Marvin Helm
 Forbes Riley as Female Reporter
 John Ritter as Steven Mayer
 Tia Texada as Conchita Perez
 Tracy Douglas as Anchor #2

References

External links
 
 

1998 films
1998 independent films
1990s mystery thriller films
American independent films
American mystery thriller films
American courtroom films
Films scored by Joel Goldsmith
Films about lawyers
Films about politicians
Films directed by Randal Kleiser
Largo Entertainment films
Legal thriller films
1990s English-language films
1990s American films